The Midget AAA World Invitational Tournament (branded as the Circle K Classic for sponsorship reasons) is an international ice hockey tournament held annually for U18 (formerly named midget-level) players in Calgary, Alberta, Canada.  First held in 1978, as the CP Challenge Cup', the tournament features 25 male teams from across Canada, the United States and Europe. 

The Circle K Classic Tournament begins on December 26 (Boxing Day) and concludes with the championship game on January 1 (New Year's Day). The round robin games are seen by around 3,000 fans, per game, at three local arenas in Calgary. They are the Max Bell Centre, the Father David Bauer Olympic Arena, and the Flames Community Arena. The main championship game is held at the Scotiabank Saddledome, where it is seen as many as 10,000 spectators. Overall, the tournament draws in as many as 100,000 spectators over the seven days.

Many of the male players here would have played at their highest point of their ice hockey careers. However, some of them went on to play in the National Hockey League. These players are recognized by the Circle K Classic tournament officials by having their photos added to the Wall of Fame at the Max Bell Centre.

On January 2, 1989, Petr Nedvěd, who was playing for the champion Chemical Works Litvínov team, left his hotel room in the middle of the night and walked into a Calgary RCMP police station. Once there, he declared his intention to defect from his native country of Czechoslovakia.

Tournament format
The current Circle K Classic tournament starts with five pools of five male teams each. Each pool is "hosted" by a Calgary area team: the Calgary Flames (AAA), the Calgary Royals, the Calgary Northstars and the Calgary Buffaloes, as well as the Airdrie CFR Bisons. They all play their ice hockey games in the Alberta Midget Hockey League. All male teams face each other in their respective round robin pools (from December 26 to 30). The top five first place and the next three highest-point second place teams, in any pool, advance to the single elimination playoff round on December 31 (New Year's Eve). From there, the remaining two teams left would play in the championship game on January 1, in order to determine the winner of the tournament.

In the former female division, there were three pools of five teams each. The main female hosts here were the Calgary Fire and the Rocky Mountain Raiders from Okotoks. The top five pool winners each and one wild-card spot advanced to the semifinals. From there, the two remaining female teams went on to play at the championship game, in order to determine the winner of the tournament.

Champions

 Note: Numbers in brackets indicated teams that have won more than one Midget AAA World Invitational Tournament championship in their history.''

Male division

Female division
The female division was introduced in 2004. Due to an alleged declining interest in women's ice hockey, the 2017 tournament was the final one that took place.

Alumni in the NHL
The following is a partial list of Circle K Classic tourney alumni who have gone on to play in the NHL.

See also
Telus Cup
Esso Cup

References

External links
Midget AAA World Invitational Tournament Official website

Ice hockey in Calgary
Ice hockey tournaments in Canada
Youth ice hockey in Canada